Craugastor olanchano is a species of frog in the family Craugastoridae.
It is endemic to Honduras.
Its natural habitats are subtropical or tropical moist montane forests and rivers.

References

Sources

olanchano
Endemic fauna of Honduras
Amphibians of Honduras
Frogs of North America
Critically endangered fauna of North America
Amphibians described in 1999
Taxonomy articles created by Polbot